Milind Gawali (born 16 June 1966) is an Indian actor and  director. He has acted in different Marathi, Hindi and Malayalam films and Television serials. He is known for playing Aniruddha Deshmukh in Star Pravah's TV Series Aai Kuthe Kay Karte.

As a child, he acted in two Children films, Hum Bachche Hindustan Ke and Govind Saraiya's Waqt Se Pehle Asan adult, he performed in the Hindi Film Vartaman directed by Pradeep Maini, followed by Hindi film Anumati, Directed by Baburam Ishara came his way. He was invited by Sanjeev Bhatacharya to Act in his ongoing Hindi Serial Campus a Television serial on Zee TV which became very popular and one after another serial came his way, like Parivartan directed by Vijay Panday, Aahat and C.I.D. directed By B.P. Singh, Balaji Telefilm's Bandhan, Itihas, Kahani Terrii Merrii, simultaneously he started Doing Marathi films like Nilambari, Aai, Maratha Battalion etc.

Early life
He did his primary schooling from Fatima High School, Vidya Vihar, and secondary schooling from Shardashram High school, Dadar, First-year College was Ambedkar College for Commerce, Second year in Kirti College, Prabhadevi, and three-year secondary till the final Year college from Lala Lajpat Rai College of Commerce at Worli, Haji Ali and Post Graduation i.e. M.Com. from The University of Mumbai.

Selected filmography

Actor

Lead actor – Hindi and other films

Lead actor – Serials

Other Serials

Marathi Serials

Telefilms

Awards and nominations
Won an award at the Honolulu Film Festival for a short film called 'Did You Notice?'
Vishesh Lakshavedi Kalakar by Zee Talkies for Marathi Film "Amhi Ka Tisare", Vishesh Lakshavedi Kalakar by Sankruti Kala Darpan for Marathi Film "Amhi Ka Tisar", Best Actor Nomination by Maharashtra State for Marathi Film "He Khel Nashibache",	Best Actor Nomination by Zee Talkies for Marathi Film "Bhavachi Laxmi", Best Supporting Actor Nomination by Zee Talkies for Marathi Film "Sakha Bhau Pakka Vairi".

See also 

 List of Indian film actors

References

External links
 Milind Gawali Official Website
 Milind Gawali On Facebook
 Milind Gawali on IMDb

Indian male film actors
Film producers from Mumbai
Indian game show hosts
Indian male television actors
Indian male voice actors
Living people
Male actors from Mumbai
University of Mumbai alumni
Male actors in Marathi cinema
Male actors in Marathi theatre
Marathi actors
1972 births
Male actors in Marathi television
Dr. Bhim Rao Ambedkar College Alumni